YMCA College may refer to a number of colleges and universities founded by or associated with YMCA:

 Central YMCA College, Chicago, Illinois, 1922–1945
 YMCA College of Physical Education, first college for physical education of Asia, was established in 1920 and affiliated to the Tamil Nadu physical education and sports university
 International YMCA College was the name of Springfield College in Massachusetts from 1912 to 1954.
Aurora University in Aurora, Illinois, USA
Osaka Young Men's Christian Association College in Osaka, Japan
Sinclair Community College in Dayton, Ohio, United States
YMCA of Hong Kong Christian College

Other colleges and universities founded by YMCA but not including "YMCA" in their name can be found in :Category:Universities and colleges founded by the YMCA.